Helena Romanes School (HRS) is a coeducational all-through school and sixth form. It is situated in Great Dunmow in the English county of Essex. A Sports and Leisure Centre, shared with the local community, is also located on site.

History 
Helena Romanes School was named after the first Chair of Governors, the daughter of Sir Almroth Wright. It was built in 1958 on the site it occupies today. More buildings were later added and it became fully comprehensive secondary school in 1970.

Previously a foundation school administered by Essex County Council, in April 2012 the school converted to academy status. The school is now sponsored by the Saffron Academy Trust.

In September 2021 Helena Romanes School opened a primary department for children ages 4 to 11. The primary department moved to a new dedicated building soon after.

Academics
Helena Romanes School offers GCSEs, BTECs, Cambridge Nationals and ASDAN awards as programmes of study for pupils.

Students in the sixth form have the option to study from a range of A-Levels and further BTECs.<ref>Helena Romanes School - Courses</ref.

References

External links
Helena Romanes School official website

Secondary schools in Essex
Educational institutions established in 1958
Academies in Essex
1958 establishments in England
Primary schools in Essex